"Everyday at the Bus Stop" is Tomoko Kawase's first single under Tommy February6, name that is associated with her birthday (February 6), and the first single that was done independent of The Brilliant Green. Some editions come with a promotional DVD. The song peaked at #12 on Oricon charts and stayed on the charts for 12 weeks.

Track listing
 Everyday at the Bus Stop
 Walk Away from You My Babe
 Since Yesterday
 Everyday at the Bus Stop (Captain Funk "Daydream" Edition)

DVD Track listing
 Everyday at the Bus Stop PV
 Everyday at the Bus Stop (Choreographic Version)
 Everyday at the Bus Stop (Karaoke Version)
 Everyday at the Bus Stop (TV Spot)
 Making of Everyday at the Bus Stop

References

2001 singles
2001 songs
Tomoko Kawase songs
Defstar Records singles
Songs written by Tomoko Kawase